bne IntelliNews, previously known as Business News Europe, is a business media company focusing on emerging markets. The company's name is stylized in all lower-case letters as "bne" and "IntelliNews" in its publications.

The company primarily offers daily news through its flagship website, but also publishes a bne IntelliNews magazine (previously called Business News Europe), a monthly English-language magazine.

bne Intellinews also offer Intellinews PRO, a news subscription that offers more analysis and articles including macro-economics, monthly country reports, and more.

Location 
The company is headquartered in Berlin. The company's staff are based in multiple locations throughout the magazine's geographic area of coverage.

History 
bne IntelliNews is the combination of bne Media (the publisher of bne magazine founded in 2006) and Emerging Markets Direct, the parent publisher of the IntelliNews news and viewswire founded in 1998. Both companies were merged in 2014 by Jerome Booth's New Sparta. bne IntelliNews is independently owned and operated, with Ben Aris as the controlling stake holder.

In 2018, bne Intellinews added Newsbase as its sister publication. Newsbase offers news for the Global Energy Markets.

Target audience 
The publication positions itself as an expert source of business news in the Emerging Markets including Europe, MENA and Asia with a target audience of investment professionals, Banking Associates, and Economists

Popularity 
Articles from bne IntelliNews have been quoted by, among others, Bloomberg Businessweek and The Economist.

References

External links 
 

Magazines established in 2006
Monthly magazines published in Germany
Magazines published in Berlin
News magazines published in Germany